Mompha divisella is a moth in the family Momphidae. It is found from southern Scandinavia to the Caucasus and central Asia.

Description
The species is brown; its thorax is brown while the forewings are greyish brown. The head is white with inward-oblique and narrowed fascia which is 3/4 in length. The scales are light greyish brown and are measured 1/4, 1/2, and 3/4 from all sides. The dorsal of a basal part is white, while the hindwings are grey. Females have a broader abdomen and fascia, which is white, with the seventh segment is being greyish brown. Adults are on wing from August to May of the following year after overwintering.

Male genitalia
The male's cacullus is slender and slightly narrowed, with broader and rounded tip. Their sacculus is tapped gradually, but is slightly bent. The apex is blunt, reaching sometimes beyond the top of cacullus. Their body also have small anellus lobes, which are clavate. The aedeagus have three carnuti, which are of the same length. The left part is broad, and is also covered and hooked with microspicules. The middle part is bifurcate, and the last one is slender and a bit pointy, with a little distal hook.

Female genitalia
The female's posterior edge is distinct and U-shaped. The vigina of the sinus is funnel shaped, and is wider than the width of the doctus borsae. Their doctus seminalis is small and oval shaped, and is placed next to the posterior part of doctus borsae.

The species is similar to Mompha bradleyi, Mompha confusella, and Mompha subdivisella.

Ecology
The larvae feed on willowherbs (Epilobium) species, including broad-leaved willowherb (Epilobium montanum), marsh willowherb (Epilobium palustre), hoary willowherb (Epilobium parviflorum), and spear-leaved willowherb (Epilobium lanceolatum). They have also been recorded on Epilobium alpinum and rosebay willowherb (Chamaenerion angustifolium), but these records need confirmation. The larvae feed inside the stem of their host plant, near the base of the leaf, causing a gall to be formed. Pupation takes place in the gall inside a white cocoon. Larvae can be found from June to July.

Finnish diet
In Finland, the species feeds on fringed willowherb (Epilobium adenocaulon).

References

External links
 Lepiforum e. V.
 Mompha divisella at UKmoths

Momphidae
Gall-inducing insects
Moths described in 1854
Moths of Asia
Moths of Europe
Taxa named by Gottlieb August Wilhelm Herrich-Schäffer